The Men's Home Internationals were an amateur team golf championship for men between the four Home Nations. Ireland was represented by the whole island of Ireland.The event was organised by The R&A. The inaugural event was held in 1932 and the venue cycled between the four nations. The winning team received the Raymond Trophy, presented by Raymond Oppenheimer, an ex-England and Walker Cup captain, in 1952. In 2022 the match was replaced by a combined Women's and Men's Home Internationals.

History
An England–Scotland Amateur Match had been first played in 1902. It was played in connection with the Amateur Championship, on the Saturday either before or after the championship. Starting in 1927 Scotland and Ireland had also played an annual match. In 1927 and 1929 this was held in Ireland, before the Irish Amateur Open Championship, while in 1928 and 1930 it was held in Scotland, just before the England–Scotland match.

The 1931 Amateur Championship was held at Royal North Devon. On the previous occasions that it had been held there, there were far fewer Scottish entries than normal and as a consequence, the Scottish team in the England–Scotland Match was not fully representative. It was therefore decided to hold the match at a different time and on a different venue, being played at Royal Liverpool in August. In addition, it was decided to play a match between England and Ireland on the day before. Ireland and Scotland had already decided to hold their match in Ireland in September. It was later arranged that a Welsh team should attend, playing matches against Scotland and Ireland on the days when England was playing Ireland and Scotland. Scotland beat England 7–6, England beat Ireland 10–4 while Wales lost 2–12 to Scotland and 2–11 to Ireland. England did not play Wales. With Scotland winning both their matches and then beating Ireland 7–6 the following month, they were regarded as the unofficial champion country.

The first tournament was held at Troon Golf Club on 2, 3, and 5 August 1932, there being no matches on the 4th. Matches followed the previous format with 5 foursome matches in the morning and 10 singles in the afternoon. Scotland and England beat Ireland and Wales on the first two days. On the final day, Scotland beat England 8–7 to win the title while Ireland beat Wales 9½–5½.

The 1933 tournament was held at Royal County Down Golf Club from 14 to 16 September. The results of all six matches were the same as in 1932, Scotland beating England in the decisive match. In the 1934 tournament at Royal Porthcawl Golf Club from 15 to 17 August, Ireland beat England on opening day. With Scotland beating England, Scotland retained the title with Ireland the runners-up. The 1935 event was held at Royal Lytham & St Annes Golf Club from 7 to 9 August. The tournament resulted in a triple-tie; England beat Ireland on the opening day, Ireland beat Scotland on the second day, and then Scotland beat England on the final day. As in previous years, Wales lost all their matches.

The 1936 event was held at Prestwick Golf Club from 29 to 31 July. Scotland beat England on the final day to win the tournament, England finishing second and Ireland third. There was a surprise on the opening day of the 1937 tournament at Portmarnock Golf Club when Wales tied their match with Scotland. Played from 1 to 3 September it was the first time the event had been held in the Irish Free State. Despite their tie, Scotland retained the title by winning their other two matches, with England again the runners-up. Royal Porthcawl hosted the event for second time in 1938, from 21 to 23 September. England gained the title after beating Scotland for the first time. Scotland was runners-up with Ireland third. The 1939 matches were planned for 20 to 22 September at Royal Lytham but were cancelled because of the start of World War II.

The tournament resumed in 1947 at Royal Liverpool from 24 to 26 September. England and Scotland won their opening two matches. On the final day, England beat Scotland 8–7 while Ireland beat Wales to finish third. The England/Scotland match went to the final green of the final match. Duncan Sutherland and Jack Pressley were all square at the last hole but Pressley took 5 to Sutherland's 4 to give England a narrow win. England retained the title in 1948 at Muirfield, played from 22 to 24 September. England beat Scotland and Ireland on the opening two days but only beat Wales 8–6 on the final day. Ireland beat Scotland to be runners-up with Scotland third. The 1949 event was held at Portmarnock from 16 to 18 May. England again won the title, although they only narrowly beat Ireland 7–6 on the final day. Wales beat Scotland 8–6 on the last day to gain their first win in the event and finish third with Scotland losing all their matches.

The 1950 event was held at Royal St. David's from 27 to 29 September. Heavy rain on the first day meant that the singles matches were not played, and were rearranged for Saturday morning, 30 September. Ireland won their opening two matches while Scotland beat England and tied with Wales. This meant that Scotland needed to beat Ireland on the final morning to win the title. Scotland held a 3–2 lead after the foursomes but Ireland won the singles 4–3 to tie the match and win the title outright for the first time. England beat Wales to finish in third place. The 1951 tournament was played at Royal Lytham & St Annes Golf Club. Ireland seemed the likely winner after beating Scotland and England, but they lost their last match to Wales 8–4, while Scotland beat England 7–6 to get their second win and tie with Ireland. Scotland won the 1952 event at Troon Golf Club, winning all three matches for the first time since 1936. England took second place. The singles could not be played on the second day, a Thursday, and were played on the Saturday. Scotland retained the title in 1953 at Killarney Golf Club, winning two matches and halving their final match against Ireland, who were runners-up.

The event was staged by England Golf, Scottish Golf, the Golfing Union of Ireland and Wales Golf until 2020 - The R&A took over organising from 2021.

Format
Each team played the other three teams over three successive days. In the final format each team had 11 players.  Each match involved 5 18-hole foursomes in the morning and 10 18-hole singles in the afternoon.

Results
{|class="wikitable sortable" style="font-size:95%;"
!Year!!Venue!!Location!!Winner!!W!!Runner-up!!W!!Third!!W!!Fourth!!W!!Refs.
|-
| align=center|2021 || Hankley Common || England ||  || align=center|2.5 ||  || align=center|2 ||  || align=center|1.5 ||  || align=center|0 || 
|-
| align=center|2020 || Royal Dornoch || Scotland || align=center colspan=8|Cancelled due to the COVID-19 pandemic || 
|-
| align=center|2019 || Lahinch || Ireland ||  || align=center|3 ||  || align=center|2 ||  || align=center|1 ||  || align=center|0 || 
|-
| align=center|2018 || Conwy || Wales ||  || align=center|3 ||  || align=center|2 ||  || align=center|1 ||  || align=center|0 || 
|-
| align=center|2017 || Moortown || England ||  || align=center|2.5/26.5 ||  || align=center|2.5/26 ||  || align=center|1 ||  || align=center|0 || 
|-
| align=center|2016 || Nairn || Scotland ||  || align=center|3 ||  || align=center|2 ||  || align=center|1 ||  || align=center|0 || 
|-
| align=center|2015 || Royal Portrush || Ireland ||  || align=center|2.5 ||  || align=center|2 ||  || align=center|1.5 ||  || align=center|0 || 
|-
| align=center|2014 || Southerndown || Wales ||  || align=center|3 ||  || align=center|1.5 ||  || align=center|1 ||  || align=center|0.5 || 
|-
| align=center|2013 || Ganton || England ||  || align=center|3 ||  || align=center|2 ||  || align=center|1 ||  || align=center|0 || 
|-
| align=center|2012 || Glasgow Gailes || Scotland ||  || align=center|2/27 ||  || align=center|2/25 ||  || align=center|2/23.5 ||  || align=center|0 || 
|-
| align=center|2011 || County Sligo || Ireland ||  || align=center|2/27 ||  || align=center|2/25.5 ||  || align=center|2/22 ||  || align=center|0 || 
|-
| align=center|2010 || Ashburnham || Wales ||  || align=center|3 ||  || align=center|1/24 ||  || align=center|1/18.5 ||  || align=center|1/17.5 || 
|-
| align=center|2009 || Hillside || England ||  || align=center|3 ||  || align=center|2 ||  || align=center|1 ||  || align=center|0 || 
|-
| align=center|2008 || Muirfield || Scotland ||  || align=center|3 ||  || align=center|2 ||  || align=center|1 ||  || align=center|0 || 
|-
| align=center|2007 || County Louth || Ireland ||  || align=center|2.5 ||  || align=center|1.5/24 ||  || align=center|1.5/21.5 ||  || align=center|0.5 || 
|-
| align=center|2006 || Pyle & Kenfig || Wales ||  || align=center|3 ||  || align=center|2 ||  || align=center|1 ||  || align=center|0 || 
|-
| align=center|2005 || Royal St George's || England ||  || align=center|2/26.5 ||  || align=center|2/21.5 ||  || align=center|1/21.5 ||  || align=center|1/20.5 || 
|-
| align=center|2004 || Prestwick || Scotland ||  || align=center|2/25.5 ||  || align=center|2/24.5 ||  || align=center|1/20.5 ||  || align=center|1/19.5 || 
|-
| align=center|2003 || Ballybunion || Ireland ||  || align=center|2.5 ||  || align=center|2 ||  || align=center|1 ||  || align=center|0.5 || 
|-
| align=center|2002 || Royal St. David's || Wales ||  || align=center|3 ||  || align=center|1.5 ||  || align=center|1 ||  || align=center|0.5 || 
|-
| align=center|2001 || Woodhall Spa || England ||  || align=center|2.5 ||  || align=center|2 ||  || align=center|1 ||  || align=center|0.5 || 
|-
| align=center|2000 || Carnoustie || Scotland ||  || align=center|2 ||  || align=center|1.5/24 ||  || align=center|1.5/22 ||  || align=center|1 || 
|-
| align=center|1999 || Royal County Down || Ireland ||  || align=center|3 ||  || align=center|2 ||  || align=center|1 ||  || align=center|0 || 
|-
| align=center|1998 || Royal Porthcawl || Wales ||  || align=center|3 ||  || align=center|1.5/25.5 ||  || align=center|1.5/23 ||  || align=center|0 || 
|-
| align=center|1997 || Burnham & Berrow || England ||  || align=center|2.5/28.5 ||  || align=center|2.5/26.5 ||  || align=center|1 ||  || align=center|0 || 
|-
| align=center|1996 || Moray || Scotland ||  || align=center|2.5 ||  || align=center|2 ||  || align=center|1.5 ||  || align=center|0 || 
|-
| align=center|1995 || Royal Portrush || Ireland ||  || align=center|2/25 ||  || align=center|2/24.5 ||  || align=center|1/23 ||  || align=center|1/17.5 || 
|-
| align=center|1994 || Ashburnham || Wales ||  || align=center|3 ||  || align=center|2 ||  || align=center|1 ||  || align=center|0 || 
|-
| align=center|1993 || Royal Liverpool || England ||  || align=center|2.5 ||  || align=center|2 ||  || align=center|1 ||  || align=center|0.5 || 
|-
| align=center|1992 || Prestwick || Scotland ||  || align=center|2.5/31 ||  || align=center|2.5/27.5 ||  || align=center|1 ||  || align=center|0 || 
|-
| align=center|1991 || County Sligo || Ireland ||  || align=center|2.5 ||  || align=center|1.5 ||  || align=center|1/21.5 ||  || align=center|1/18.5 || 
|-
| align=center|1990 || Conwy || Wales ||  || align=center|3 || colspan=3| and  tied || align=center|1/22.5 ||  || align=center|1/17 || 
|-
| align=center|1989 || Ganton || England ||  || align=center|3 ||  || align=center|2 ||  || align=center|1 ||  || align=center|0 || 
|-
| align=center|1988 || Muirfield || Scotland ||  || align=center|3 ||  || align=center|1.5/24.5 ||  || align=center|1.5/19.5 ||  || align=center|0 || 
|-
| align=center|1987 || Lahinch || Ireland ||  || align=center|3 ||  || align=center|1.5 ||  || align=center|1 ||  || align=center|0.5 || 
|-
| align=center|1986 || Royal St. David's || Wales ||  || align=center|3 ||  || align=center|1.5 ||  || align=center|1 ||  || align=center|0.5 || 
|-
| align=center|1985 || Formby || England ||  || align=center|3 ||  || align=center|2 ||  || align=center|1 ||  || align=center|0 || 
|-
| align=center|1984 || Royal Troon || Scotland ||  || align=center|2/24.5 ||  || align=center|2/24 ||  || align=center|1.5 ||  || align=center|0.5 || 
|-
| align=center|1983 || Portmarnock || Ireland ||  || align=center|2.5 ||  || align=center|2 ||  || align=center|1.5 ||  || align=center|0 || 
|-
| align=center|1982 || Royal Porthcawl || Wales ||  || align=center|2/24.5 ||  || align=center|2/23.5 ||  || align=center|1.5 ||  || align=center|0.5 || 
|-
| align=center|1981 || Woodhall Spa || England ||  || align=center|3 ||  || align=center|2 ||  || align=center|0.5/18 ||  || align=center|0.5/17.5 || 
|-
| align=center|1980 || Royal Dornoch || Scotland ||  || align=center|2.5 ||  || align=center|2 ||  || align=center|1 ||  || align=center|0.5 || 
|-
| align=center|1979 || Royal County Down || Ireland || align=center colspan=8|Cancelled || 
|-
| align=center|1978 || Ashburnham || Wales ||  || align=center|3 || colspan=5|,  and  tied || align=center|1 || 
|-
| align=center|1977 || Hillside || England ||  || align=center|3 ||  || align=center|2 ||  || align=center|1 ||  || align=center|0 || 
|-
| align=center|1976 || Muirfield || Scotland ||  || align=center|3 ||  || align=center|2 ||  || align=center|1 ||  || align=center|0 || 
|-
| align=center|1975 || Portmarnock || Ireland ||  || align=center|3 ||  || align=center|2 ||  || align=center|1 ||  || align=center|0 || 
|-
| align=center|1974 || Royal St. David's || Wales ||  || align=center|2.5 ||  || align=center|2 ||  || align=center|1 ||  || align=center|0.5 || 
|-
| align=center|1973 || Royal Lytham & St Annes || England ||  || align=center|3 ||  || align=center|1.5 ||  || align=center|1 ||  || align=center|0.5 || 
|-
| align=center|1972 || Troon || Scotland || colspan=3| and  tied || align=center|2.5 ||  || align=center|1 ||  || align=center|0 || 
|-
| align=center|1971 || Formby || England ||  || align=center|3 ||  || align=center|2 ||  || align=center|1 ||  || align=center|0 || 
|-
| align=center|1970 || Royal Porthcawl || Wales ||  || align=center|3 ||  || align=center|1.5 ||  || align=center|1 ||  || align=center|0.5 || 
|-
| align=center|1969 || Killarney || Ireland ||  || align=center|2.5 ||  || align=center|1.5 || colspan=3| and  tied || align=center|1 || 
|-
| align=center|1968 || Gullane || Scotland ||  || align=center|3 ||  || align=center|2 ||  || align=center|1 ||  || align=center|0 || 
|-
| align=center|1967 || Ganton || England ||  || align=center|3 ||  || align=center|2 ||  || align=center|1 ||  || align=center|0 || 
|-
| align=center|1966 || Royal Porthcawl || Wales ||  || align=center|3 ||  || align=center|2 ||  || align=center|1 ||  || align=center|0 || 
|-
| align=center|1965 || Royal Portrush || Ireland ||  || align=center|3 ||  || align=center|2 ||  || align=center|1 ||  || align=center|0 || 
|-
| align=center|1964 || Carnoustie || Scotland ||  || align=center|3 ||  || align=center|2 ||  || align=center|1 ||  || align=center|0 || 
|-
| align=center|1963 || Royal Lytham & St Annes || England || colspan=5|,  and  tied || align=center|2 ||  || align=center|0 || 
|-
| align=center|1962 || Royal Porthcawl || Wales || colspan=5|,  and  tied || align=center|2 ||  || align=center|0 || 
|-
| align=center|1961 || Portmarnock || Ireland ||  || align=center|3 ||  || align=center|2 ||  || align=center|1 ||  || align=center|0 || 
|-
| align=center|1960 || Turnberry || Scotland ||  || align=center|2.5 ||  || align=center|2 ||  || align=center|1.5 ||  || align=center|0 || 
|-
| align=center|1959 || Royal Lytham & St Annes || England || colspan=5|,  and  tied || align=center|2 ||  || align=center|0 || 
|-
| align=center|1958 || Royal Porthcawl || Wales ||  || align=center|3 ||  || align=center|2 ||  || align=center|1 ||  || align=center|0 || 
|-
| align=center|1957 || Royal County Down || Ireland ||  || align=center|3 ||  || align=center|2 ||  || align=center|1 ||  || align=center|0 || 
|-
| align=center|1956 || Muirfield || Scotland ||  || align=center|3 ||  || align=center|2 ||  || align=center|1 ||  || align=center|0 || 
|-
| align=center|1955 || Royal Birkdale || England ||  || align=center|2.5 ||  || align=center|2 ||  || align=center|1.5 ||  || align=center|0 || 
|-
| align=center|1954 || Royal Porthcawl || Wales ||  || align=center|3 || colspan=5|,  and  tied || align=center|1 || 
|-
| align=center|1953 || Killarney || Ireland ||  || align=center|2.5 ||  || align=center|1.5 || colspan=3| and  tied || align=center|1 || 
|-
| align=center|1952 || Troon || Scotland ||  || align=center|3 ||  || align=center|1.5 ||  || align=center|1 ||  || align=center|0.5 || 
|-
| align=center|1951 || Royal Lytham & St Annes || England || colspan=3| and  tied || align=center|2 || colspan=3| and  tied || align=center|1 || 
|-
| align=center|1950 || Royal St. David's || Wales ||  || align=center|2.5 ||  || align=center|2 ||  || align=center|1 ||  || align=center|0.5 || 
|-
| align=center|1949 || Portmarnock || Ireland ||  || align=center|3 ||  || align=center|2 ||  || align=center|1 ||  || align=center|0 || 
|-
| align=center|1948 || Muirfield || Scotland ||  || align=center|3 ||  || align=center|2 ||  || align=center|1 ||  || align=center|0 || 
|-
| align=center|1947 || Royal Liverpool || England ||  || align=center|3 ||  || align=center|2 ||  || align=center|1 ||  || align=center|0 || 
|-
| align=center colspan=12|1939–1946: Not held
|-
| align=center|1938 || Royal Porthcawl || Wales ||  || align=center|3 ||  || align=center|2 ||  || align=center|1 ||  || align=center|0 || 
|-
| align=center|1937 || Portmarnock || Ireland ||  || align=center|2.5 ||  || align=center|2 ||  || align=center|1 ||  || align=center|0.5 || 
|-
| align=center|1936 || Prestwick || Scotland ||  || align=center|3 ||  || align=center|2 ||  || align=center|1 ||  || align=center|0 || 
|-
| align=center|1935 || Royal Lytham & St Annes || England || colspan=5|,  and  tied || align=center|2 ||  || align=center|0 || 
|-
| align=center|1934 || Royal Porthcawl || Wales ||  || align=center|3 ||  || align=center|2 ||  || align=center|1 ||  || align=center|0 || 
|-
| align=center|1933 || Royal County Down || Ireland ||  || align=center|3 ||  || align=center|2 ||  || align=center|1 ||  || align=center|0 || 
|-
| align=center|1932 || Troon || Scotland ||  || align=center|3 ||  || align=center|2 ||  || align=center|1 ||  || align=center|0 || 
|}

Source:

Match scores
The following table gives the match scores. For a particular event these will not be in chronological order. E=England, I=Ireland, S=Scotland, W=Wales.

TeamsThis list is incomplete''

The following played in at least one match.

England
2021 Sam Bairstow, Callan Barrow, Jack Bigham, Zachary Chegwidden, Jack Dyer, Arron Edwards-Hill, John Gough, Josh Hill, Olly Huggins, Haider Hussain, Laird Shepherd
2019 Jake Burnage, Callum Farr, Bailey Gill, Harry Hall, Ben Hutchinson, Ben Jones, Matty Lamb, Joshua McMahon, Thomas Plumb, Ben Schmidt, Tom Sloman
2018 Jake Burnage, Bailey Gill, David Hague, Ben Jones, David Langley, Joe Long, Thomas Plumb, Nick Poppleton, Tom Sloman, Mitch Waite, Andrew Wilson
2017 Dan Brown, Jack Burnage, Todd Clements, Jack Gaunt, David Hague, Josh Hilleard, Matthew Jordan, Bradley Moore, Gian-Marco Petrozzi, Tom Sloman, Will Whiteoak
2016 Dan Brown, Adam Chapman, Will Enefer, Harry Hall, Josh Hilleard, Marco Penge, Gian-Marco Petrozzi, Alfie Plant, Ashton Turner, James Walker, Jack Yule
2015 Tomasz Anderson, Jamie Bower, Dan Brown, Ashley Chesters, Joe Dean, Paul Kinnear, Jimmy Mullen, Alfie Plant, Ben Taylor, Sean Towndrow, Ashton Turner
2014 Tomasz Anderson, Harry Casey, Adam Chapman, Ashley Chesters, Sebastian Crookall-Nixon, Ryan Evans, Luke Johnson, Paul Kinnear, Nick Marsh, Ben Stow, Dan Wasteney
2013 Harry Casey, Ryan Evans, Craig Hinton, Paul Howard, Nick Marsh, Jimmy Mullen, Jamie Rutherford, Michael Saunders, Callum Shinkwin, Ben Stow, Toby Tree
2012 Sebastian Crookall-Nixon, Harry Ellis, Jack Hiluta, Nathan Kimsey, Garrick Porteous, Neil Raymond, Jamie Rutherford, Callum Shinkwin, Jordan Smith, Ben Stow, Joshua White
2011 Steven Brown, Dave Coupland, Tyrrell Hatton, Craig Hinton, Ben Loughrey, Garrick Porteous, Neil Raymond, Jack Senior, Ben Stow, Andy Sullivan, Ben Taylor
2010 Jamie Abbott, Laurie Canter, Tommy Fleetwood, Tom Lewis, Chris Lloyd, Matthew Nixon, Chris Paisley, Eddie Pepperell, Jack Senior, Matthew Southgate, Darren Wright
2009 Jamie Abbott, Tommy Fleetwood, Luke Goddard, Matt Haines, Stiggy Hodgson, Sam Hutsby, Farren Keenan, Matthew Nixon, Chris Paisley, James Robinson, Dale Whitnell
2008 Jamie Abbott, Todd Adcock, Tommy Fleetwood, Charlie Ford, Luke Goddard, Sam Hutsby, Matt Haines, Farren Keenan, Eddie Pepperell, Tom Sherreard, Steve Uzzell, Dale Whitnell
2007 Matthew Baldwin, Gary Boyd, Matthew Cryer, Ben Evans, Charlie Ford, Sam Hutsby, Ben Parker, Dale Whitnell, Danny Willett, Gary Wolstenholme, Chris Wood
2006 Gary Boyd, Robert Dinwiddie, Oliver Fisher, Adam Gee, Steve Lewton, Ross McGowan, Jamie Moul, Ben Parker, Edward Richardson, Paul Waring, Gary Wolstenholme
2005 James Crampton, Matthew Cryer, Robert Dinwiddie, Oliver Fisher, Adam Gee, Jamie Moul, Edward Richardson, James Ruth, Steven Tiley, Paul Waring, Gary Wolstenholme
2004 Lee Corfield, Robert Dinwiddie, Lawrence Dodd, Adam Gee, James Heath, Gary Lockerbie, Matthew Richardson, James Ruth, Michael Skelton, Steven Tiley, Gary Wolstenholme
2003 Paul Bradshaw, Graeme Clark, Colin Edwards, Ross Fisher, James Heath, John Kemp, Gary Lockerbie, Michael Skelton, David Skinns, Richard Walker, Gary Wolstenholme
2002 Yasin Ali, Jamie Elson, Graeme Clark, Lee Corfield, Richard Finch, Jon Lupton, Zane Scotland, David Skinns, Richard Walker, Oliver Wilson, Gary Wolstenholme
2001 Paul Bradshaw, Graeme Clark, Jamie Elson, Scott Godfrey, David Griffiths, Jon Lupton, Richard McEvoy, Zane Scotland, David Skinns, Richard Walker, Gary Wolstenholme
2000 David Dixon, Nick Dougherty, Jamie Elson, Richard Finch, David Griffiths, Richard McEvoy, Phil Rowe, David Ryles, Zane Scotland, Tom Whitehouse, Gary Wolstenholme
1999 Simon Dyson, David Griffiths, Max Harris, Ben Mason, Chris Rodgers, Mark Sanders, Mark Side, Graeme Storm, Aran Wainwright, John Wells, Gary Wolstenholme
1998 Luke Donald, Simon Dyson, Colin Edwards, Kenneth Ferrie, Max Harris, Mark Hilton, Ben Mason, Simon McCarthy, Phil Rowe, Mark Sanders, Gary Wolstenholme
1997 Matthew Blackey, Luke Donald, Robert Duck, Colin Edwards, Shaun Philipson, Michael Reynard, Justin Rose, Phil Rowe, Aran Wainwright, Karl Wallbank, Gary Wolstenholme
1996 Matthew Blackey, Warren Bladon, Matt Carver, Luke Donald, Peter Fenton, Denny Lucas, Michael Reynard, Karl Wallbank, Shaun P. Webster, Robert Wiggins, Gary Wolstenholme
1995 Matthew Blackey, Richard Bland, Gary Clark, Scott Drummond, Colin Edwards, Mark Foster, David Howell, Lee S. James, David Lynn, Steve Webster, Gary Wolstenholme
1994 Warren Bennett, Richard Bland, Colin Edwards, David Fisher, Mark Foster, Gary Harris, Jonathan Hodgson, David Howell, Lee S. James, Michael Welch, Gary Wolstenholme
1993 Warren Bennett, Colin Edwards, David Fisher, Ralph Hutt, Lee S. James, Paul Page, Iain Pyman, Matt Stanford, Michael Welch, Lee Westwood, Gary Wolstenholme
1992 Warren Bennett, Stuart Cage, Colin Edwards, Ian Garbutt, Ralph Hutt, Matt McGuire, Mark Pullan, Paul Streeter, Matt Stanford, Carl Watts, Gary Wolstenholme
1991 Colin Edwards, Ralph Hutt, Ian Garbutt, Nick Ludwell, Peter McEvoy, Mark Pullan, Andy Rogers, Matt Stanford, Carl Watts, Gary Winter, Gary Wolstenholme
1990 David Bathgate, James Cook, Bobby Eggo, Gary Evans, Ian Garbutt, Jim Payne, Andrew Sandywell, Liam White, Mark Wiggett, Ricky Willison, Gary Wolstenholme
1989 Craig Cassells, James Cook, Chris Davison, Bobby Eggo, Peter McEvoy, John Metcalfe, Tony Nash, Jim Payne, Ricky Willison, Roger Winchester, Gary Wolstenholme
1988 Russell Claydon, Bobby Eggo, Kenny Fairbairn, Andrew Hare, Peter McEvoy, Tony Nash, Steven Richardson, Carl Suneson, Kevin Weeks, Ricky Willison, Gary Wolstenholme
1987 Bob Bardsley, Paul Broadhurst, David Curry, Bobby Eggo, Wayne Henry, Peter McEvoy, Steven Richardson, Alex Robertson, Roger Roper, Kevin Weeks, Roger Winchester
1986 Steve Bottomley, Paul Broadhurst, David Curry, Bobby Eggo, Jonathan Langmead, Peter McEvoy, Richard Muscroft, Steven Richardson, Alex Robertson, Jeremy Robinson, Roger Roper
1985 Peter Baker, Mark Davis, Freddie George, David Gilford, John Hawksworth, Graham Homewood, Craig Laurence, Peter McEvoy, Roger Roper, Michael Walls, Roger Winchester
1984 David Curry, Mark Davis, Peter Deeble, David Gilford, Stephen Hamer, John Hawksworth, Craig Laurence, Peter McEvoy, Jonathan Plaxton, Roger Roper, Andrew Sherborne
1983 Charlie Banks, Peter Deeble, David Gilford, Stephen Hamer, Peter Hedges, Stephen Keppler, Craig Laurence, Peter McEvoy, Andrew Oldcorn, Jonathan Plaxton, Andrew Sherborne
1982 Richard Boxall, Paul Downes, Peter Hedges, Michael Kelley, Stephen Keppler, Malcolm Lewis, Andrew Oldcorn, David Ray, Andrew Sherborne, Andy Stubbs, Martin Thompson
1981 David Blakeman, Richard Boxall, Roger Chapman, Peter Deeble, Paul Downes, Geoffrey Godwin, Michael Kelley, Malcolm Lewis, Peter McEvoy, Michael Walls, Paul Way
1980 Richard Boxall, Andrew Carman, Roger Chapman, Peter Deeble, Paul Downes, Pat Garner, Geoffrey Godwin, Michael Kelley, Malcolm Lewis, Peter McEvoy, Michael Walls
1978 Paul Carrigill, Peter Deeble, John Davies, Paul Downes, Pat Garner, Geoffrey Godwin, Peter Hedges, Paul Hoad, Michael Kelley, Peter McEvoy, Chris Mitchell
1977 Peter Deeble, Paul Downes, Pat Garner, Geoffrey Godwin, Peter Hedges, Mike Inglis, Michael Kelley, Sandy Lyle, Peter McEvoy, Terry Shingler, Hogan Stott
1976 Gordon J. Brand, Peter Deeble, Paul Downes, Geoffrey Godwin, Peter Hedges, Michael Kelley, Sandy Lyle, Peter McEvoy, Chris Mitchell, Martin Poxon, Hogan Stott
1975 Peter Deeble, Richard Eyles, Nick Faldo, Peter Hedges, Mark James, Rodney James, Michael Kelley, Sandy Lyle, Geoff Marks, Chris Mitchell, Martin Poxon
1974 Harry Ashby, Michael Bonallack, Nigel Burch, John Davies, John Downie, Richard Eyles, Peter Hedges, Mark James, Rodney James, Michael Kelley, Geoff Marks
1973 Harry Ashby, Geoff Birtwell, Howard Clark, John Davies, Martin Foster, Peter Hedges, Trevor Homer, Michael King, Garry Logan, Carl Mason, Roger Revell
1972 Harry Ashby, Peter Berry, Michael Bonallack, John Davies, Rodney Foster, Trevor Homer, Michael King, David Marsh, Peter Moody, Roger Revell, Bill Smith
1971 Michael Bonallack, Gordon Clark, John Davies, Rodney Foster, Warren Humphreys, Michael King, Geoff Marks, David Marsh, Peter Moody, Ian Mosey, John Yeo
1970 Peter Benka, Geoff Birtwell, Michael Bonallack, Bruce Critchley, Rodney Foster, Peter Hedges, Warren Humphreys, Michael King, Geoff Marks, David Marsh, Donald Steel
1969 Peter Benka, Michael Bonallack, John Cook, Bruce Critchley, John Davies, Peter Dawson, Rodney Foster, Michael King, Geoff Marks, David Marsh, Peter Tupling
1968 Michael Attenborough, Peter Benka, Geoff Birtwell, Michael Bonallack, Gordon Clark, Rodney Foster, Gordon Hyde, David Kelley, Geoff Marks, David Marsh, Peter Oosterhuis
1967 Michael Attenborough, Peter Benka, Michael Bonallack, Michael Burgess, Gordon Clark, Bob Durrant, Rodney Foster, Gordon Hyde, Geoff Marks, David Moffat, Peter Oosterhuis
1966 Michael Attenborough, John Bloxham, Michael Bonallack, Gordon Clark, Rodney Foster, David Kelley, Michael Lunt, David Marsh, Dudley Millensted, Peter Oosterhuis, Peter Townsend
1965 Michael Bonallack, Michael Burgess, Clive Clark, Gordon Clark, David Kelley, Mike Lee, David Marsh, Dudley Millensted, David Moffat, Brian Stockdale, Peter Townsend
1964 Michael Bonallack, Michael Burgess, Martin Christmas, Clive Clark, Gordon Clark, Rodney Foster, Michael Lunt, David Marsh, Brian Stockdale, Alan Thirlwell
1963 Michael Bonallack, Michael Burgess, Martin Christmas, Rodney Foster, David Frame, Peter Green, Michael Lunt, Geoff Marks, David Moffat, David Palmer, Lionel Smith, Alan Thirlwell
1962 Michael Bonallack, Brian Chapman, Martin Christmas, Bruce Critchley, David Frame, Peter Green, Alex Holmes, Gordon Huddy, Keith Warren, Michael Lunt, David Palmer, Alan Slater
1961 Michael Bonallack, Ian Caldwell, Brian Chapman, Martin Christmas, Gordon Clark, George Evans, David Frame, Peter Green, Gordon Huddy, David Moffat, David Neech
1960 Sam Brough, Michael Bonallack, Martin Christmas, David Frame, Gordon Huddy, Michael Lunt, David Marsh, David Moffat, Doug Sewell, Alec Shepperson, Guy Wolstenholme
1959 Sam Brough, Michael Bonallack, Ian Caldwell, David Frame, Michael Lunt, David Marsh, David Moffat, Doug Sewell, Alec Shepperson, Guy Wolstenholme
1958 Michael Bonallack, Ian Caldwell, Stan Fox, David Frame, Michael Lunt, David Marsh, Doug Sewell, Alec Shepperson, Alan Thirlwell, Guy Wolstenholme
1957 Michael Bonallack, Ian Caldwell, Michael Lunt, David Marsh, Arthur Perowne, Doug Sewell, Alec Shepperson, Tony Slark, Alan Thirlwell, Guy Wolstenholme
1956 John Beharrell, Ian Caldwell, Stan Fox, Michael Lunt, David Marsh, Doug Sewell, Alec Shepperson, Keith Tate, Alan Thirlwell, Guy Wolstenholme
1955 Sam Brough, Ian Caldwell, Leonard Crawley, Jackie Jones, Gerald Micklem, Bunny Millward, Arthur Perowne, Philip Scrutton, Alan Slater, Keith Tate, Alan Thirlwell, Guy Wolstenholme
1954 Ian Caldwell, Leonard Crawley, Jackie Jones, Gerald Micklem, Bunny Millward, Arthur Perowne, Charlie Stowe, Keith Tate, Alan Thirlwell, Ronnie White
1953 Ian Caldwell, John Langley, Gerald Micklem, Bunny Millward, Arthur Perowne, Dixon Rawlinson, Geoffrey Roberts, Harley Roberts, Ken Thom, Ronnie White, Guy Wolstenholme
1952 Sam Brough, Ian Caldwell, Jackie Jones, John Langley, Gerald Micklem, Bunny Millward, Ian Patey, Mike Pearson, Dixon Rawlinson, Alan Thirlwell, Alan Turner
1951 Harry Bennett, Edward Bromley-Davenport, Ian Caldwell, Jackie Jones, John Langley, Gerald Micklem, Jack Payne, Mike Pearson, Arthur Perowne, Geoffrey Roberts, Alan Thirlwell
1950 Ian Caldwell, Jackie Jones, John Langley, Malcolm Lee, Gerald Micklem, Bunny Millward, Jack Payne, Arthur Perowne, Dixon Rawlinson, Philip Scrutton, Steve Tredinnick
1949 Harry Bennett, Leonard Crawley, Jackie Jones, Laddie Lucas, Gerald Micklem, Reg Pattinson, Arthur Perowne, Dixon Rawlinson, Charlie Stowe, Ken Thom, Ronnie White
1948 Harry Bennett, Leonard Crawley, Alan Helm, Jackie Jones, Laddie Lucas, Gerald Micklem, Arthur Perowne, Harley Roberts, Jimmy Rothwell, Charlie Stowe, Ken Thom, Ronnie White
1947 Dickie Bell, Harry Bentley, Leonard Crawley, Gerald Micklem, Frank Pennink, Arthur Perowne, Harley Roberts, Jimmy Rothwell, Charlie Stowe, Duncan Sutherland, Ken Thom, Ronnie White, Bill Wise
1938 Sidney Banks, Harry Bentley, Edward Bromley-Davenport, Leonard Crawley, Kenneth Frazier, Joe Gent, John Lyon, Dennis Martin, Frank Pennink, Kenneth Scott, Charlie Stowe, Tom Thirsk, Cyril Tolley
1937 Arnold Bentley, Harry Bentley, Leonard Crawley, Alec Hill, John Lyon, Frank Pennink, Kenneth Scott, Charlie Stowe, Tom Thirsk, Guy Thompson, Charles Timmis, Cyril Tolley
1936 Arnold Bentley, Harry Bentley, Leonard Crawley, Francis Francis, Alec Hill, Laddie Lucas, Philip Risdon, Eustace Storey, Charlie Stowe, Tom Thirsk, Charles Timmis, Cyril Tolley
1935 Harry Bentley, Eric Fiddian, Rex Hartley, Stanley Lunt, Philip Risdon, Charlie Stowe, Tom Thirsk, Guy Thompson, William Tweddell, Roy Walton, John Woollam, John Zacharias
1934 Sidney Banks, Roger Bayliss, Harry Bentley, Dale Bourn, Leonard Crawley, Eric Fiddian, Rex Hartley, Stanley Lunt, James Snowden, Tom Thirsk, Roy Walton, John Woollam
1933 Roger Bayliss, John Beck, Harry Bentley, Dale Bourn, Leonard Crawley, Eric Fiddian, Norman Fogg, Lister Hartley, Rex Hartley, Stanley Lunt, Tom Thirsk, Ivor Thomas, John Woollam
1932 Harry Bentley, Thomas Bowman, Stewart Bradshaw, Leonard Crawley, Eric Fiddian, Cyril Gray, Lister Hartley, Stanley Lunt, Allan Newey, Reginald Straker, Edward Tipple

Ireland
2021 Marc Boucher, Alan Fahy, Hugh Foley, T. J. Ford, Alex Maguire, Matt McClean, Jack McDonnell, Robert Moran, Liam Nolan, Peter O'Keeffe, Caolan Rafferty
2019 Rob Brazill, Colm Campbell, Keith Egan, Sean Flanagan, Matthew McClean, Tom McKibbin, Tiarnán McLarnon, Ronan Mullarney, Conor Purcell, Caolan Rafferty, James Sugrue
2018 Robbie Cannon, Robin Dawson, Alex Gleeson, Tiarnan McLarnon, Ronan Mullarney, Peter O'Keeffe, Mark Power, Conor Purcell, Colin Rafferty, James Sugrue, Jonathan Yates
2017 Colm Campbell, Robin Dawson, Colin Fairweather, John-Ross Galbraith, Alex Gleeson, Rowan Lester, Paul McBride, Peter O'Keeffe, Conor O'Rourke, Conor Purcell, Colin Rafferty
2016 Colm Campbell, Robin Dawson, Sean Flanagan, John-Ross Galbraith, Alex Gleeson, Stuart Grehan, Rowan Lester, Paul McBride, Tiarnan McLarnon, Conor O'Rourke, Conor Purcell
2015 Colm Campbell, Robin Dawson, Colin Fairweather, John-Ross Galbraith, Alex Gleeson, Stuart Grehan, Jack Hume, Rowan Lester, Paul McBride, Dermot McElroy, Gavin Moynihan
2014 Richard Bridges, Colm Campbell, Robin Dawson, Paul Dunne, Jack Hume, Gary Hurley, Dermot McElroy, Gavin Moynihan, John-Ross Galbraith, Chris Selfridge, Cormac Sharvin
2013 Brian Casey, Paul Dunne, Jack Hume, Gary Hurley, Dermot McElroy, Rory McNamara, Gavin Moynihan, Kevin Phelan, Chris Selfridge, Cormac Sharvin, Reeve Whitson
2012 Harry Diamond, Alan Dunbar, Nicky Grant, Gary Hurley, Dermot McElroy, Rory McNamara, Gavin Moynihan, Richard O'Donovan, Kevin Phelan, Chris Selfridge, Reeve Whitson
2011 Eoin Arthurs, Paul Cutler, Alan Dunbar, Paul Dunne, Niall Gorey, Aaron Kearney, Eddie McCormack, Gary McDermott, Dermot McElroy, Richard O'Donovan, Kevin Phelan
2010 Barry Anderson, Paul Cutler, Connor Doran, Alan Dunbar, Paul Dunne, Luke Lennox, Rory Leonard, Dara Lernihan, Eddie McCormack, Pat Murray, Kevin Phelan
2009 Robert Cannon, Cian Curley, Paul Cutler, Connor Doran, Alan Dunbar, Niall Kearney, Dara Lernihan, Pat Murray, Kelan McDonagh, Paul O'Kane, Simon Ward
2008 Eoin Arthurs, Jonathan Caldwell, Cian Curley, Paul Cutler, Alan Dunbar, Niall Kearney, Dara Lernihan, Shane Lowry, Paul O'Hanlon, Cathal O'Malley, Simon Ward

Scotland
2021 George Burns, Angus Carrick, Matthew Clark, Stuart Easton, Rory Franssen, Darren Howie, Lewis Irvine, Ruben Lindsay, Andrew Ni, Connor Wilson, James Wilson
2019 George Burns, Kieran Cantley, Matthew Clark, Stuart Easton, Darren Howie, Lewis Irvine, Ryan Lumsden, Eric McIntosh, Euan McIntosh, Connor McKinney, James Wilson
2018 Kieran Cantley, Matthew Clark, Stuart Easton, Calum Fyfe, Jim Johnston, Ryan Lumsden, Euan McKintosh, Stephen Roger, Euan Walker, James Wilson, Jeff Wright
2017 Matthew Clark, Rory Franssen, Craig Howie, Liam Johnston, Sam Locke, Ryan Lumsden, Chris MacLean, Craig Ross, Sandy Scott, Jamie Stewart, Euan Walker
2016 Matthew Clark, George Duncan, Calum Fyfe, Craig Howie, Barry Hume, Liam Johnston, Euan McIntosh, Graeme Robertson, Craig Ross, Jamie Savage, Sandy Scott
2015 Ryan Campbell, Matthew Clark, Craig Howie, Barry Hume, Robert MacIntyre, Greig Marchbank, Jack McDonald, Graeme Robertson, Craig Ross, Connor Syme, Daniel Young
2014 Matthew Clark, Adam Dunton, Scott Gibson, Greig Marchbank, Jack McDonald, Chris Robb, Graeme Robertson, Craig Ross, James Ross, Jamie Savage, Daniel Young
2013 Scott Borrowman, Matthew Clark, Scott Crichton, Alexander Culverwell, Grant Forrest, Jack McDonald, Bradley Neil, Graeme Robertson, James Ross, Ewan Scott, Daniel Young
2012 Ross Bell, Scott Borrowman, Matthew Clark, Paul Ferrier, Grant Forrest, Jack McDonald, Fraser McKenna, Graeme Robertson, Paul Shields, Brian Soutar, James White
2011 James Byrne, Scott Gibson, Ross Kellett, David Law, Philip McLean, Kris Nicol, Greg Paterson, Graeme Robertson, Paul Shields, Michael Stewart, James White
2010 James Byrne, Allyn Dick, Jordan Findlay, Ross Kellett, Peter Latimer, Philip McLean, Kris Nicol, Greg Paterson, Brian Soutar, Michael Stewart, James White
2009 Wallace Booth, James Byrne, Glenn Campbell, Gavin Dear, Ross Kellett, David Law, Steven McEwan, Michael Stewart, Keir McNicoll, Paul O'Hara, James White
2008 Wallace  Booth, Glenn Campbell, Gavin Dear, Scott Henry, Ross Kellett, Callum Macaulay, Steven McEwan, Keir McNicoll, Paul O'Hara, Michael Stewart, Gordon Yates

Wales
2021 James Ashfield, Tomi Bowen, Ben Chamberlain, Jacob Davies, Aled Greville, Kieron Harman, Luke Harries, Tim Harry, Tom Matthews, Craig Melding, Matt Roberts
2019 George Bryant, Ben Chamberlain, Jacob Davies, Rhys Evans, Tom Froom, Jake Hapgood, Kieron Harman, Connor Jones, Matt Roberts, Lewys Sanges, Gaelan Trew
2018 Oliver Brown, Ben Chamberlain, Archie Davies, Jacob Davies, Jake Hapgood, Kieron Harman, Patrick Mullins, Matt Roberts, Lewys Sanges, Gaelan Trew, Tom Williams
2017 Ben Chamberlain, Jack Davidson, Joshua Davies, Owen Edwards, Evan Griffith, Jake Hapgood, Matthew Harris, Tim Harry, Llewellyn Matthews, Lewys Sanges, Tom Williams
2016 Ben Chamberlain, Jack Davidson, Joshua Davies, Owen Edwards, Zach Galliford, Evan Griffith, Kyle Harman, Lee Jones, Llewellyn Matthews, Patrick Mullins, Tom Williams
2015 David Boote, Jack Davidson, Joshua Davies, Owen Edwards, Zach Galliford, Evan Griffith, Tim Harry, Mike Hearne, Richard James, Ben Westgate, Tom Williams
2014 David Boote, Jack Bush, Ryan Davies, Owen Edwards, Zach Galliford, Evan Griffith, Mike Hearne, Richard James, Lee Jones, Matt Moseley, Ben Westgate
2013 David Boote, Jack Bush, Zach Galliford, Mike Hearne, Richard James, Alistair Jones, Lee Jones, Craig Melding, Matthew Moseley, Jason Shufflebotham, Ben Westgate
2012 Jonathan Bale, Richard Bentham, David Boote, James Frazer, Richard James, Geraint Jones, William Jones, Rhys Pugh, Jason Shufflebotham, Luke Thomas, Ben Westgate
2011 Richard Bentham, David Boote, Rhys Enoch, Oliver Farr, James Frazer, Richard Hooper, Alastair Jones, Rhys Pugh, Jason Shufflebotham, Joe Vickery, Ben Westgate
2010 Jonathan Bale, Nigel Edwards, Rhys Enoch, Oliver Farr, James Frazer, Nick James, Richard James, Alastair Jones, Chris Nugent, Rhys Pugh, Joe Vickery
2009 Nigel Edwards, Rhys Enoch, Oliver Farr, James Frazer, Richard Hooper, Alistair Jones, Rhys Pugh, Adam Runcie, Luke Thomas, Joe Vickery, Ben Westgate
2008 Nigel Edwards, Ben Enoch, Rhys Enoch, Craig Evans, Oliver Farr, James Frazer, Zac Gould, Jamie Howie, Adam Runcie, Joe Vickery, Ben Westgate

References

Team golf tournaments
Amateur golf tournaments
Golf in England
Golf in Ireland
Golf in Scotland
Golf in Wales
R&A championships
Recurring sporting events established in 1932
Recurring sporting events disestablished in 2021